The 612th Air Operations Center (612 AOC) is an active unit of the United States Air Force, assigned to the Twelfth Air Force and stationed at Davis–Monthan Air Force Base, Arizona. First activated in 1994, the unit coordinates air and space assets in the U.S. Southern Command area of responsibility, covering 31 countries in the Caribbean, as well as Central and South America. Past missions have included the coordination of all flight operations in response to the 2010 Haiti earthquake. In 2007, the unit opened a new $55 million command center.

Structure
The 612th Air Operations Center consists of the following six elements:
 1st Battlefield Coordination Detachment (1st BCD)
 Air Mobility Division (AMD)
 Combat Operations Division (COD)
 Combat Plans Division (CPD)
 Intelligence, Surveillance, and Reconnaissance Division (ISRD)
 Strategy Division (SRD)

Lineage
 Established as the 612th Air Operations Group and activated on 1 January 1994
 Redesignated as 612th Air and Space Operations Center on 29 February 2008
 Redesignated as 612th Air Operations Center on 15 November 2014

Assignments
 Twelfth Air Force, 1 January 1994–present

Stations
 Davis–Monthan Air Force Base, Arizona, 1 January 1994–present

References 

Centers of the United States Air Force